Sanderston is a settlement in South Australia. It is at the foot of the eastern slopes of the Mount Lofty Ranges, and was on the Sedan railway line (which ran south–north) where it crossed the road from Mount Pleasant (west) to the Murray River at Walker Flat (east).

The Baptist church building opened in 1905 but is now closed. The town once also had a store and post office.

References

Further reading

Towns in South Australia